"Real Man" is a song written and recorded by American country music artist Billy Dean.  It was released in July 1998 as the first single and title track from the album Real Man.  The song reached #33 on the Billboard Hot Country Singles & Tracks chart.

Chart performance

References

1998 singles
1998 songs
Billy Dean songs
Songs written by Billy Dean
Capitol Records Nashville singles